HZC De Robben (Hilversum Zwem Club De Robben) is a swimming club in Hilversum, Netherlands. The association organizes swimming lessons and also has sections for the competition sports water polo and swimming competitions. HZC De Robben uses the pool Lieberg. The club's colors are blue and orange.

History
De Robben was founded on January 1, 1971. HZC De Robben is the result of the merger of the Hilversum Zwem Club (HZC) which was established on August 24, 1932 and De Robben which founded on 15 October 1940. One of the most famous coaches was Jan Stender, who because of his shaggy hair on the chest and back and his approach also known as 'Gorilla'. The water polo department has won many Dutch Championships (11) also supplied the association for many internationals Dutch water polo team. For the season 2014-2015 the association is a Start Community entered into with BZC Brandenburg which Ilse van der Meijden was appointed as head coach.

Titles & achievements

Men
 Domestic competitions
Dutch League
 Winners (11): 1959-60, 1966-67, 1967-68, 1968-69, 1969-70, 1970-71, 1971-72, 1973-74, 1974-75, 1979-80, 1981-82
Dutch Cup (KZNB)
 Winners (2): 1985-86, 2000-01

 European competitions
LEN Champions League
 4th place (1): 1971-72, 1974-75, 1975-76

Women
 Domestic competitions
Dutch League
 Winners (29): 1945–46, 1946–47, 1948–49, 1949–50, 1950–51, 1951–52, 1952–53, 1953–54, 1954–55, 1955–56, 1956–57, 1957–58, 1958–59, 1959–60, 1960–61, 1961–62, 1962–63, 1963–64, 1964–65, 1965–66, 1966–67, 1967–68, 1968–69, 1969–70, 1970–71, 1971–72, 1972–73, 1973–74, 1974–75

External links
 Official website

Water polo clubs in the Netherlands
Sports clubs in Hilversum
1971 establishments in the Netherlands
Sports clubs established in 1971